The Roman presence in the Arabian Peninsula had its foundations in the expansion of the empire under Augustus, and continued until the Arab conquests of Eastern Roman territory from the 620s onward.

Initial contacts

The volume of commerce between Rome and India via Red Sea and Arabian Sea was huge since the conquest of Egypt by the Romans in 30 BC, according to the historian Strabo: 120 Roman vessels sailed every year from Berenice Troglodytica and many times touched southern Arabia Felix on their travel to India, while doing the Spice Route. Mostly in order to secure the maritime route from piracy, the Romans organized an expedition under Aelius Gallus in which the port of Aden (then called Eudaemon) in southern Arabia was occupied temporarily. The Romans furthermore maintained a small legionary garrison in the Nabataean port of Leuke Kome ("meaning "the white village", located north of the Arabian port of Jeddah) in the 1st century in order to control the commerce of spices, according to the academic Theodor Mommsen (see Indo-Roman trade relations). 

Frankincense and myrrh, two spices highly prized in antiquity as fragrances, could only be obtained from trees growing in southern Arabia, Ethiopia, and Somalia. Arab merchants brought these goods to Roman markets by means of camel caravans along the Incense Route. This Incense Route originally commenced at Shabwah in Hadhramaut, the easternmost kingdom of South Arabia, and ended at Petra. Strabo compared the immense traffic along the desert routes to that of an army. The Incense Route ran along the western edge of Arabia's central desert about 100 miles inland from the Red Sea coast. The Roman Pliny the Elder stated that the journey consisted of sixty-five stages divided by halts for the camels. Both the Nabataeans and the South Arabians grew tremendously wealthy through the transport of these goods destined for the Roman Empire.

Gallus's expedition

Gaius Aelius Gallus was the second praefectus Aegypti (governor of Roman Egypt), from 26 to 24 BC. Accounts of his expedition to Arabia Felix are given by Strabo, Cassius Dio and Pliny the Elder. Strabo's account is particularly detailed, and derives most of its information from Aelius Gallus himself, who was a personal friend of Strabo.

Then part of the Kingdom of Saba, the area of modern-day Yemen was called Arabia Felix ( or 'Fortunate Arabia') by the Romans, reflecting its perceived prosperity. The success of the Sabaeans was based on their cultivation and trade of valuable spices and aromatics, including frankincense and myrrh. Irrigation of these crops was enabled by the Great Dam of Ma'rib. Strabo mentions that Ilasaros was the ruler of Hadhramaut at that time.

Augustus commanded Gallus to undertake a military expedition to Arabia Felix in 26 BC, where he was to either conclude treaties making the Arabian people foederati (i.e., client states), or to subdue them if they resisted. According to Theodor Mommsen, Aelius Gallus sailed with 10,000 legionaries from Egypt and landed at Leuce Kome, a trading port of the Nabateans in the northwestern Arabian coast. Gallus' subsequent movements relied on a Nabataean guide called Syllaeus, who proved to be untrustworthy. As a result of Syllaeus' misdirections, the army took six months to reach Ma'rib, the Sabaean capital.

Gallus besieged Ma'rib unsuccessfully for a week, before being forced to withdraw. Mommsen ascribes this to a combination of disease, over-extended supply lines, and a tougher desert environment than the Romans had expected. Gallus' retreat to Alexandria was completed in sixty days. The supporting Roman fleet had more success: they occupied and destroyed the port of Eudaemon (modern Aden), securing the Roman merchant route to India.

Trajan and the Arabia Petraea province

The Nabateans maintained close relations with the Romans since their arrival in the southeastern Mediterranean area. Under Augustus they were a Roman client kingdom.

When the emperor Trajan started his military expansions toward the east Rabbel II Soter, one of Rome's client kings, died. This event prompted the annexation of the Nabataean Kingdom, although the manner and the formal reasons for the annexation are unclear. Some epigraphic evidence suggests a military operation, with forces from Syria and Egypt. What is clear, however, is that by 107, Roman legions were stationed in the area around Petra and Bostra, as is shown by a papyrus (and other evidences) found in Egypt.

The Roman Empire gained what became the province of Arabia Petraea (modern southern Jordan and north west Saudi Arabia).

The conquest of Arabia was not officially exulted until the completion of the Via Traiana Nova in 120s.  This road extended down the center of the province from Bostra to Aqaba.  It wasn't until the project was finished that coins, featuring Trajan's bust on the obverse and a camel on the reverse, appeared commemorating the acquisition of Arabia.  These coins were minted until 115, at which time the Roman imperial focus was turning farther eastward.  The road links not only Bostra and Aqaba, but also Petra and was continued by a "caravan road" south the coast of western Arabia until the port of Leuce Kome.

Recently further evidence has been discovered that Roman legions occupied Mada'in Saleh in the Hijaz Mountains area of northwestern Arabia, increasing the extension of the "Arabia Petraea" province. Particularly interested in the East, Trajan secured Indian Ocean trade by establishing a garrison on tropical Farasan island, in the south of that sea.

Hadrian probably restructured the province after the Trajan expansion, reducing the area to nearly half the original size (at the west of what was called the Limes Arabicus) in order to better defend Arabia Petraea from raiders and enemies. The same process occurred in Caledonia, when he abandoned the Roman forts around Inchtuthil and the Gask Ridge and created Hadrian's Wall in Roman Britain (reducing the Roman-controlled area of Scotland).

Under emperor Septimius Severus Arabia Petraea was expanded to include the Leja’ and Jabal al-Druze, rough terrain south of Damascus, and also the birthplace of M. Julius Phillipus (Philip the Arab).

Indeed, the Romans found a powerful ally in the Arabs called Ghassanids, who moved from the area of Marib to southern Syria mainly in the 2nd century. The Ghassanids were the buffer zone against the other Bedouins penetrating Roman territory in those years. More accurately their kings can be described as phylarchs, native rulers of subject frontier states. Their capital was at Jabiyah in the Golan Heights. Geographically, the Ghassanid kingdom occupied much of Syria, Mount Hermon (Lebanon), Jordan and Palestine, and its authority extended via tribal alliances with other "Azdi" tribes all the way to the northern Hejaz as far south as Yathrib (Medina).

Furthermore, precise Arab ancestry of the Roman emperor Philip the Arab is not known, since all sources give only the Latin names of him and his family members. However, having originated from the general area in which the Ghassanids settled, many historians consider he may have been of that origin. His being mentioned either as a Christian himself or at least tolerant of Christians would fit with his originating from a people which was in the process of Christianization at the time of his rule.

Septimius Severus enlarged a province that was already huge. He then proceeded to enlarge the empire, through the conquest of Mesopotamia.  The transfer of the Leja’ and Jebel Drūz seemed to have been part of a shrewd series of political acts on the emperor's part to consolidate control of the area before this conquest.  Arabia became the ideological power base for Septemius Severus in the Roman Near East.

Arabia became such a symbol of loyalty to Severus and the empire, according to Bowersock, that during his war against Clodius Albinus, in Gaul, Syrian opponents propagated a rumour that the Third Cyrenaica legion controlling Arabia Petraea had defected.  That it would matter to an issue in Gaul that a single legion in a backwater province on the other side of the empire would rebel indicates the political sway that Arabia had amassed.  Not a land of significant population, resources, or even strategic position, it had become a bedrock of Roman culture.  That it was an Eastern Roman culture didn't seem to dilute its effectiveness in matters in the west.  It is precisely because Arabia Petraea had so little that it was able to define itself as Roman and that spurred its loyalty to Imperial Rome.

Another example of the loyalty to Rome of the Arab tribes of northern Arabia was Lucius Septimius Odaenathus. He was "the son of Lucius Septimius Herod (Hairān), the senator and chief of Tadmor, the son of Vaballathus (Wahballath), the son of Nasor" and was the romanized Arab ruler of Palmyra and later his wife Zenobia and son Vaballathus ruled the short lived Palmyrene Empire.  Odenatus, in the second half of the 3rd century, succeeded in recovering the Roman East from the Sassanids and restoring it to the Empire.

With Emperor Diocletian's restructuring of the empire in 284–305, Arabia Petraea province was enlarged to include parts of modern-day Palestine.  Arabia after Diocletian was a part of the Diocese of the East, which was part of the Praetorian prefecture of the East and was largely Christian.

The province was conquered by the Arab Muslims under the Caliph Umar in the early 7th century: the Legio III Cyrenaica was destroyed defending Bosra in 630, ending the Roman presence in Arabia.

See also
Pre-Islamic Arabia
Roman trade with India
Spice Route
Limes (Roman Empire)

References

Bibliography

 Bowersock, G. Roman Arabia Harvard University Press. Harvard, 1983
Fisher, G. Rome, Persia, and Arabia. Shaping the Middle East from Pompey to Muhammad. Routledge, 2020. 
 De Maigret, Alessandro. Arabia Felix. Stacey International. London, 2002. 
 Miller, James Innes (1969). The Spice Trade of the Roman Empire. Oxford: Oxford University Press. .
 Mommsen, Theodor. Römische Geschichte 8 Volumes. dtv, München 2001. 
 
 Von Wissmann, H. "Die Geschichte des Säbaerreichs und der Felzug des Æelius Gallus". Haase ed. Munchen, 1976
 Young, Gary Keith. Rome's Eastern Trade: International Commerce and Imperial Policy, 31 BC-AD 305. Routledge. London, 2001

External links
Romans explored Arabia in Augustus times
 Arabia and the Roman Empire (in Italian)
Roman Forts in Limes Arabicus
 A map of the  showing the outposts that made up Hadrian's limes
Romans and Arabia (google book)

Arabia
History of Saudi Arabia